Mkrtich Harutyunyan, known by the pen name Mkrtich Armen (December 14, 1906 in Alexandropol – December 22, 1972 in Yerevan) was a Soviet and Armenian writer and poet.

Biography
He was born in Alexandropol (modern-day Gyumri) to a family of artisans, and studied at the Gerasimov Institute of Cinematography in Moscow.

He wrote novels and short stories that made him famous in his native Armenia and in the wider Soviet Union. His magnum opus is the 1935 novel Heghnar aghbyur (The Fountain of Heghnar), which was later made into a film. He fell out of favor with the authorities, was deported to Siberia, and later released. He published an account of camp life in 1964 and died eight years later in Yerevan.

References

1906 births
1972 deaths
20th-century Armenian novelists
20th-century male writers
Soviet novelists
People from Gyumri
Recipients of the Order of the Red Banner of Labour
Armenian male novelists
Armenian novelists